Emmanuel Rodriguez may refer to:

Emmanuel Rodríguez (born 1992), Puerto Rican boxer 
Emmanuel Rodriguez (entertainer), former member of the Australian pop group Justice Crew
Emmanuel Rodriguez  (born 1934), real name of Rico Rodriguez (musician)